City Boy is the debut album from the English rock band City Boy.

Track listing

Musicians
 Lol Mason - lead vocals, percussion
 Mike Slamer - lead and rhythm guitars, backing vocals
 Steve Broughton - rhythm and 12-string guitars, lead vocals, mandolin, percussion
 Max Thomas - keyboards, backing vocals, 12-string guitar
 Chris Dunn - bass, backing vocals, acoustic guitar
 Roger Kent - drums, percussion

Personnel
 Mick Glossop - Engineer
 Robert John "Mutt" Lange - Producer

Cherry Red reissue
Cherry Red's Lemon Recordings announced in May 2015 plans to reissue City Boy's first four album releases as double CDs with bonus tracks. Release date is set for 17 July 2015.

City Boy (disc 1) and Dinner At The Ritz (disc 2) (City Boy's second album) are complemented by six bonus tracks on disc 1. New sleeve notes are provided by Malcolm Dome.

Press releases inform these releases are re-mastered from original tapes, and that this is the first official release of these albums on CD.

References

1976 debut albums
City Boy (band) albums
Albums produced by Robert John "Mutt" Lange
Vertigo Records albums
Mercury Records albums